Castel Sant'Elia (locally ) is a comune (municipality) in the Province of Viterbo, Latium, central Italy, located about  north of Rome and about  southeast of Viterbo.

Main sights
Castel Sant'Elia's main attraction is the Basilica of Sant'Elia or Sant'Anastasio, a medieval church built, according to tradition, over an ancient temple of Diana. It dates to the 1120s and is built in tuff with three portals, all sculpted with flowers, animals and monstrous figures. The interior comprises a nave and two aisles, divided by re-used ancient columns. Under the apse is the crypt, housing the tombs of St. Anastasius and St. Nonnosus.

Nearby is the Sanctuary of Santa Maria ad Rupes, housing a tunnel with 144 steps carved by hand by a local hermit, an endeavor that took 14 years.

References

External links
 Official website

Cities and towns in Lazio